Caroline Miller is a former elected member of the county commission of Multnomah County, Oregon in the United States, and a published author. Since leaving the political arena, Miller has been a prolific writer. She has published three novels: Trompe l'Oeil in 2012, Gothic Spring and Heart Land in 2009. Her short stories have been published in Children's Digest and Grit and Tales of the Talisman, and her short story, Under the Bridge and Beneath the Moon, were dramatized for radio in Oregon and Washington. Miller's two-act play, "Woman on the Scarlet Beast," was performed by the Post5 Theatre company in Portland, Oregon Jan 20-Feb.8 2015.

During her political life, Miller served a term as an original councilor with Metro. She was elected to two consecutive four-year terms (the maximum permitted) as a member of the Multnomah County Commission, leaving office in 1988. Miller was a strong advocate for citizen involvement in government, created many social services for those in need, including ex-offenders, created a Bill of Rights for patient care in assisted living facilities and initiated the program for health care clinics in the schools in conjunction with Portland Public Schools.  She was the first Hispanic to serve on the Multnomah County Board of Commissioners. She also headed the Portland Federation of Teachers. She was the first woman parliamentarian for the Oregon AFL conventions and was inducted into the Oregon Labor Hall of Fame.

She holds a B.A. and M.A.T. degree from Reed College and an M.A. in Literature from Northern Arizona University where she graduated with honors.

Bibliography

Novels 
 Republished by Rutherford Classics, 2017
 Republished by Rutherford Classics, 2017
 Republished by Rutherford Classics, 2017
 Republished by Rutherford Classics, 2017

Play 

 Woman on the Scarlet Beast produced by the Post5 Theatre in Portland, Oregon, January 20, 2015 - February 8, 2015.

Stories 

 The Christmas Eve of Doubting Thomas Young American 2/11/89 vol. 5, number 25, Dec. 12, 1988  TX 2-746-004
 Under the Bridge and Beneath the Moon Children's Digest Vol. 38 Number 368  12/1988  TX2-746-003
 Yearnings 1994 Oregon English Journal XV11 number 2 Fall 1994 TX3-978-620
 Saying Goodbye 1996 The Advocate Vol. 11, No. 1  Feb/March 1997 TX4-539-268
 The Summer of the Burlap Bag 2000 Grab a Nickel XXVII, Vol. 1 Summer 2000 TX5-290-796l
 Bodacious Scurvy 2000 Caprice XIV #2 Summer 2000  (An excerpt from Angel McBride and the Sonja Henie Doll.) TX5-313-975
 Doll Purchase was Meant to Be 2003 Grit Vol. 121, Number 16 Dec. 1, 2003 TX5-902-667 
 Grimahlka Tales of the Talisman 3/007 Volume 11, Issue 4,  March 2007 TX6-538-658
 Proverbs Mosaic June 2007, 46th edition 
 Marie Eau-Claire published by The Colored Lens  May 1, 2012
 Agent of God published by WolfSinger Publications in its anthology, Under a Dark Sign,  October 2015
 Gustav Pavel published by Fixional, July 2017
 Secrets published in Adelaide, Sept 2017 Vol 9

References

External links
 Reed College Magazine interview June 2015 Miller '59, MAT '65, dusts off script after a dramatic pause lasting four decades
 KBOO radio interview with Miller, January 2015, discussing her play, Woman on the Scarlet Beast
 Publishing advice from Miller, January 2013.
 Radio interview with Miller, January 2013.
 Interview  in NW Boomer and Senior News, September 2014, Vol. 16, number 9, pg 18.

Living people
21st-century American novelists
American women novelists
Reed College alumni
Politicians from Portland, Oregon
Metro councilors (Oregon regional government)
21st-century American women writers
Year of birth missing (living people)